Ahmed Abou Talib is a former commander of the Egyptian Air Defence Forces. He graduated from the Military College in April 1959 and was commissioned in a SPAAG regiment.
He was Commander-in-Chief of the Air Defence Forces from April 1993 to April 1996.

Major Activities:

Commanding a Battalion of SA-3 and ZSU-23-4 during the War of Attrition between 1970 and 1973. Chief of Operations in 2nd SAM Brigade from 1973 until 1977. Commander of 1st SAM Brigade between 1979 and 1982.
Starting the operation of central sector of command, control and communication system of the Air defence forces.
Participated in the following wars:

 1967 war
 1973 war

References

Egyptian generals
1938 births
Living people